The Vogel–Fulcher–Tammann equation, also known as Vogel–Fulcher–Tammann–Hesse equation or Vogel–Fulcher equation (abbreviated: VFT equation), is used to describe the viscosity of liquids as a function of temperature, and especially its strongly temperature dependent variation in the supercooled regime, upon approaching the glass transition. In this regime the viscosity of certain liquids can increase by up to 13 orders of magnitude within a relatively narrow temperature interval. 

The VFT equation reads as follows:

These three parameters are normally used as adjustable parameters to fit the VFT equation to experimental data of specific systems.

The VFT equation is named after Hans Vogel, Gordon Scott Fulcher (1884–1971) and Gustav Tammann (1861–1938).

References
 
 
 
 

Equations of fluid dynamics
Equations of physics